Valeriy Avdysh (11 November 1950) is a Assyrian Ukrainian football referee and former footballer who played for SC Tavriya Simferopol. After retiring as a player, Avdysh became a football referee.

Avdysh was a linesman at the exhibition game between Russia and Poland that took place on 2 June 1996 in Moscow, Russia.

Valeriy Avdysh is a younger brother of the late Ukrainian football manager Zaya Avdysh.

References

External links
 Valeriy Avdysh (player) and Valeriy Avdysh (referee) at the footballfacts.ru
 Valeriy Avdysh at the footballfacts.ru
 Valeriy Avdysh at the Football Referee Committee of Ukraine

1950 births
Living people
Sportspeople from Zhytomyr
Ukrainian people of Assyrian descent
Soviet footballers
Soviet football referees
Ukrainian footballers
Ukrainian football referees
FC Polissya Zhytomyr players
FC Spartak Ivano-Frankivsk players
SC Tavriya Simferopol players
NK Veres Rivne players
Association football defenders